Sgouros Spata (1399–1403) was the Lord of Arta briefly in 1400, and the Lord of Angelokastron from 1401 until his death in 1403, during warfare in a civil war.

Life

Shortly before John Spata died on 29 October (1399, according to Nicol; 1400 according to others), he appointed his brother, Sgouros, ruler of Naupactus, as his successor as the despot of Arta. A few days after Sgouros took over Arta, however, the town was captured by the adventurer Vonko. While Sgouros fled to Angelokastron, a short time after, possibly as early as December 1399 (or by the end of 1401), Maurice Spata, his grandnephew, managed to evict Vonko from Arta and took over the governance of the city himself, while Sgouros thus took over governance of Angelokastron.

In 1402/3, Maurice came to Sgouros' aid when the latter was besieged at Angelokastron by the forces of Carlo I Tocco. The attack, under Carlo's general Galasso Peccatore, was repulsed, but Sgouros died soon after, from wounds suffered in the war, leaving his possessions to his son Paul Spata.

Aftermath

Sgouros was succeeded by his son Paul, who became an Ottoman vassal and was aided with a contingent that was defeated by Tocco in 1406, after the latter had turned on the offensive, Angelokastron was ceded to the Turks and Paul retired to Naupaktos, however he sold it in 1407 to the Republic of Venice. Because of Paul's withdrawal, Maurice Spata and Tocco divided Aetolia and Acarnania between themselves. In 1408, Tocco holds Angelokastron.

Annotations

References

Sources

 
 

Milan Šufflay, Srbi i Arbanasi (1925)

14th-century births
1403 deaths
Medieval Albanian nobility
15th-century Albanian people
15th-century monarchs in Europe
Despots of Arta
Sgouros
History of Aetolia-Acarnania